The 1984 World 600, the 25th running of the event, was a NASCAR Winston Cup Series racing event that took place on May 27, 1984. A souvenir program from this race cost $4 ($ when adjusted for inflation).

Background
Charlotte Motor Speedway was designed and built by Bruton Smith and partner and driver Curtis Turner in 1959. The first World 600 NASCAR race was held at the  speedway on June 19, 1960. On December 8, 1961, the speedway filed bankruptcy notice.  Judge J.B. Craven of US District Court for Western North Carolina reorganized it under Chapter 10 of the Bankruptcy Act; Judge Craven appointed Robert "Red" Robinson as the track's trustee until March 1962.  At that point, a committee of major stockholders in the speedway was assembled, headed by A.C. Goines and furniture store owner Richard Howard.   Goines, Howard, and Robinson worked to secure loans and other monies to keep the speedway afloat.

By April 1963 some $750,000 was paid to twenty secured creditors and the track emerged from bankruptcy; Judge Craven appointed Goines as speedway president and Howard as assistant general manager of the speedway, handling its day-to-day operations.  By 1964 Howard become the track's general manager, and on June 1, 1967, the speedway's mortgage was paid in full; a public burning of the mortgage was held at the speedway two weeks later.

Smith departed from the speedway in 1962 to pursue other business interests, primarily in banking and auto dealerships from his new home of Rockford, IL. He became quite successful and began buying out shares of stock in the speedway.  By 1974 Smith was more heavily involved in the speedway, to where Richard Howard by 1975 stated, "I haven't been running the speedway.  It's being run from Illinois." In 1975  Smith had become the majority stockholder, regaining control of its day-to-day operations. Smith hired H.A. "Humpy" Wheeler as general manager in October 1975, and on January 29, 1976, Richard Howard resigned as president and GM of the speedway.

Race report
The actor Burt Young (Paulie from the popular Rocky film series) was the official starter. There were 42 drivers on the grid; Benny Parsons received the last-place finish due to an ignition issue on the sixth lap out of the 400. Racing legend David Pearson was the lowest earner in this race, making $800 for his ninth-place finish. The next lowest earner was Doug Heveron, who was paid $1,275 for being 248 laps behind in 40th.

Trevor Boys was the only driver not American-born. Notable drivers that competed included: Terry Labonte, Sterling Marlin, Bill Elliott, Darrell Waltrip, Cale Yarborough, and Rusty Wallace. Nearly 150000 fans would see Bobby Allison defeat Dale Earnhardt after five caution periods; marking the last win for the G-body Buick Regal in a NASCAR Winston Cup Series race. The entire race lasted more than four and a half hours. Twenty-two different changes in the first-place position were observed during the race.

There was rain between lap 248 and 256 which was caused by a cold front which attempted to simmer down the very hot temperatures during the race; it subsided until lap 281. There WERE officially 48 caution laps during the race; with most of them being caused by accidents and engine failures caused by the constant pressures of high-speed racing.

Kyle Petty and his father Richard also competed at this race. The younger Petty charged from 41st starting position to seventh in the races first 100 miles but dropped out on lap 193 due to a blown engine. Senator Jesse Helms was a genuine fan of Richard Petty and had the opportunity to meet him during the event.

Allison would end up in a slump and not win another race until the 1986 Winston 500 at Alabama International Motor Speedway in Talladega, Alabama.

Top 10 finishers

Standings after the race

References

World 600
World 600
NASCAR races at Charlotte Motor Speedway